Ralph Brennan is a New Orleans-based restaurateur and head of The Ralph Brennan Restaurant Group.

A former CPA with Price Waterhouse & Company, Brennan entered the family business in the early 1980s as one of a group of eight third-generation cousins active in the United States restaurant industry.  His company runs seven restaurants, six of which are in New Orleans, as well as a catering business. Among them:

BACCO was an Italian restaurant in the French Quarter opened in 1991, Closed 2010
Red Fish Grill, also in the French Quarter, opened in 1997
Ralph Brennan's Jazz Kitchen in Downtown Disney, Anaheim, California as one of its original tenants in 2001
Ralph’s on the Park, adjacent to historic City Park in Mid-City New Orleans, opened in 2003
Cafe NOMA Located in the New Orleans Museum of Art in City Park, Opened 2009
Ralph Brennan Catering & Events Opened 2011
Heritage Grill, Located In Heritage Plaza on Veterans Blvd, Opened 2011
Cafe B Located on Metairie Road, Opened 2011
Brennan's Restaurant Co-owner with Terry White, Opened 2014
Napoleon House, Acquired May 2015

Brennan is co-owner of three additional restaurants:

Mr. B’s Bistro
Commander's Palace
Brennan’s of Houston

Among Brennan's industry honors are the 1997 Gold Plate Operator of the Year, the highest honor bestowed by the International Foodservice Manufacturers Association. He has also served as president of the National Restaurant Association as well as chairman of its educational foundation.

References

External links
The Ralph Brennan Restaurant Group

Living people
American restaurateurs
1951 births
Culinary Institute of America people